Numbulwar, formerly known as Rose River Mission, is a small, primarily Aboriginal community on the Gulf of Carpentaria in the Northern Territory of Australia. The major language group of the community is Nunggubuyu and their language, Wubuy, is used by older generations. Kriol is also widely spoken.

Permanent settlement began in 1952 with the founding of the Rose River Mission by local Aboriginal communities and the Church Missionary Society.

The Mission operated until the 1970s when community control passed to the Numbulwar Numburindi Community Council.

The community consists of a general store, a police station, a community school, an engine repair shop, a post office and about 670 residents. Formerly, Mission Aviation Fellowship had a base in Numbulwar which provided air services for the community, but now residents use commercial companies for this service.

References 

Aboriginal communities in the Northern Territory
Towns in the Northern Territory